Alan Pérez Lezaun (born 15 July 1982 in Yerri, Navarre) is a Spanish retired professional road bicycle racer.

Major results
2004
 1st Stage 4 Vuelta a Navarra
 4th Time trial, National Under-23 Road Championships

Grand Tour general classification results timeline

References

External links 
Profile at Euskaltel-Euskadi official website 

1982 births
Living people
People from Estella Oriental
Spanish male cyclists
Cyclists from Navarre